The following table shows the world record progression in the men's 4 × 200 metres relay in athletics.

References

4x100, men
4 × 200 metres relay